The Postal, Telegraph and Telephone International (PTTI) was a global union federation bringing together unions of communications workers worldwide.

History
While a meeting of unions of communication workers was held in Paris in 1911, no lasting organisation was established until 1920, when the PTTI was founded at a meeting in Milan.  Initially, the federation consisted entirely of European unions, but after World War II, it expanded worldwide, and by 1994 had four million members.

By 1997, new forms of communication had grown in importance, and the federation renamed itself as the Communications International.  At the end of 1999, it merged with the International Federation of Commercial, Clerical, Professional and Technical Employees, the International Graphical Federation, and the Media and Entertainment International, to form Union Network International.

Affiliates
In 1998, the following unions were affiliated:

Leadership

General Secretaries
1911: Felix Koch
1919: Ludwig Maier
1936: Franz Rohner
1940: Fritz Gmür
1965: Stefan Nedzynski
1989: Philip Bowyer

Presidents
1920: John William Bowen
1949: Charles Geddes
1957: William Norton
1960: Carl Stenger
1966: Ron Smith
1967: Charles Delacourt-Smith
1969: Joseph A. Beirne
1974: Ivan Reddish
1979: Ernst Breit
1984: Glenn Watts
1985: Akira Yamagishi
1990: Curt Persson
1997: Kurt van Haaren

References

Trade unions established in 1920
Trade unions disestablished in 1999
Global union federations
Communications trade unions